In order theory, a branch of mathematics, an order embedding is a special kind of monotone function, which provides a way to include one partially ordered set into another. Like Galois connections, order embeddings constitute a notion which is strictly weaker than the concept of an order isomorphism. Both of these weakenings may be understood in terms of category theory.

Formal definition 

 

If an order embedding between two posets  and  exists, one says that  can be embedded into .

Properties 

An order isomorphism can be characterized as a surjective order embedding. As a consequence, any order embedding f restricts to an isomorphism between its domain S and its image f(S), which justifies the term "embedding". On the other hand, it might well be that two (necessarily infinite) posets are mutually order-embeddable into each other without being order-isomorphic. 

An example is provided by the open interval  of real numbers and the corresponding closed interval . The function  maps the former to the subset  of the latter and the latter to the subset of the former, see picture. Ordering both sets in the natural way,  is both order-preserving and order-reflecting (because it is an affine function). Yet, no isomorphism between the two posets can exist, since e.g.  has a least element while  does not.
For a similar example using arctan to order-embed the real numbers into an interval, and the identity map for the reverse direction, see e.g. Just and Weese (1996).

A retract is a pair  of order-preserving maps whose composition  is the identity. In this case,  is called a coretraction, and must be an order embedding. However, not every order embedding is a coretraction. As a trivial example, the unique order embedding  from the empty poset to a nonempty poset has no retract, because there is no order-preserving map . More illustratively, consider the set  of divisors of 6, partially ordered by x divides y, see picture. Consider the embedded sub-poset .

Additional Perspectives 

Posets can straightforwardly be viewed from many perspectives, and order embeddings are basic enough that they tend to be visible from everywhere. For example:
 (Model theoretically) A poset is a set equipped with a (reflexive, antisymmetric and transitive) binary relation. An order embedding A → B is an isomorphism from A to an elementary substructure of B.
 (Graph theoretically) A poset is a (transitive, acyclic, directed, reflexive) graph. An order embedding A → B is a graph isomorphism from A to an induced subgraph of B.
 (Category theoretically) A poset is a (small, thin, and skeletal) category such that each homset has at most one element. An order embedding A → B is a full and faithful functor from A to B which is injective on objects, or equivalently an isomorphism from A to a full subcategory of B.

See also
Dushnik–Miller theorem
Laver's theorem

References

Order theory